Beaumesnil is a former commune in the Eure department in Normandy in northern France. On 1 January 2016, it was merged into the new commune of Mesnil-en-Ouche. The Château de Beaumesnil, a 17th-century Louis XIII baroque style château, is located to the north-east of the village.

Population

See also
Communes of the Eure department

References

External links

Official site

Former communes of Eure